The Ministry of Health of Argentina is a ministry of the national executive power that oversees, elaborates and coordinates the Argentine national state's public health policy. The ministry is responsible for overseeing Argentina's highly decentralized universal health care system, which according to 2000 figures, serviced over half of the country's population.

The current minister responsible is Carla Vizzotti, who has served since 20 February 2021 in the cabinet of President Alberto Fernández, after her predecessor, ex-minister Ginés González García was found guilty of vaccine nepotism.

Structure and dependencies
The Ministry of Health and Sustainable Development counts with a number of centralized and decentralized dependencies. The centralized dependencies, as in other government ministers, are known as secretariats (secretarías) and undersecretariats (subsecretarías), as well as a number of other centralized agencies; each of the undersecretariats of the ministry counts with a number of directorates and other centralized agencies, which assess different types of healthcare-related areas:

Secretariat of Health Quality (Secretaría de Calidad en Salud)
Undersecretariat of Quality, Regulation and Fiscalization (Subsecretaría de Calidad, Regulación y Fiscalización)
Undersecretariat of Services and Institutes Administration (Subsecretaría de Gestión de Servicios e Institutos)
Secretariat of Health Equality (Secretaría de Equidad en Salud)
Undersecretariat of Federal Articulation (Subsecretaría de Articulación Federal)
Undersecretariat of Systems Integration (Subsecretaría de Integración de los Sistemas)
Secretariat of Health Access (Secretaría de Acceso a la Salud)
Undersecretariat of Medication and Strategic Information (Subsecretaría de Medicamentos e Información Estratégica)
Undersecretariat of Health Strategies (Subsecretaría de Estrategias Sanitarias)

Several "deconcentrated" agencies also report to and depend on the Ministry of Health, such as the Superintendency of Health Services (SSS), the National Agency of Public Laboratories (ANLAP), the Comprehensive Medical Attention Program (PAMI), the National Administration of Medicine, Food and Medical Technology (ANMAT), the Dr. Carlos Malbrán National Administration of Laboratories and Healthcare Institutes (ANLIS Malbrán), and the National Cancer and National Tropical Medicine Institutes.

There are also a number of decentralized agencies that report to the Ministry, such as the National Psycho-physical Rehabilitation Institute of the South (INAREPS), the Only Central National Institute for Excision and Implants (Incucai), the Dr. Manuel Montes de Oca National Summer Camp, and the Baldomero Sommer, Laura Bonaparte and Alejandro Posadas national hospitals.

Headquarters

The Ministry of Health has been headquartered in the Ministry of Public Works Building (which, as its name indicates, was originally the headquarters of the Ministry of Public Works) since 1991. The building is now considered an iconic landmark of Buenos Aires due to the large framed steel images of Eva Perón that hang from the southern and northern facades of the building, located at the interception of 9 de Julio Avenue and Belgrano Avenue, in the Monserrat barrio of Buenos Aires.

List of ministers

See also
Health care in Argentina
List of hospitals in Argentina

References

External links
 

Health
Argentina
Argentina
1949 establishments in Argentina
Healthcare in Argentina